IMEP is a chemotherapy regimen that is effective for nasal NK- / T-cell lymphoma. This chemotherapy regimen was also tested in Hodgkin disease as a part of a multidrug alternating scheme COPP / ABV / IMEP. But in that setting it showed no advantage in efficacy and toxicity compared to the use of ABVD or the alternating COPP / ABVD scheme.

Drug regimen

References 

Chemotherapy regimens used in lymphoma